In mathematics, the Kodaira–Spencer map, introduced by Kunihiko Kodaira and Donald C. Spencer, is a map associated to a deformation of a scheme or complex manifold X, taking a tangent space of a point of the deformation space to the first cohomology group of the sheaf of vector fields on X.

Definition

Historical motivation 
The Kodaira–Spencer map was originally constructed in the setting of complex manifolds. Given a complex analytic manifold  with charts  and biholomorphic maps  sending  gluing the charts together, the idea of deformation theory is to replace these transition maps  by parametrized transition maps  over some base  (which could be a real manifold) with coordinates , such that . This means the parameters  deform the complex structure of the original complex manifold . Since the base can be assumed to be a polydisk, this process gives a map between the tangent space of the base to  called the Kodaira–Spencer map.

Original definition 
More formally, the Kodaira–Spencer map is

where
 is a smooth proper map between complex spaces (i.e., a deformation of the special fiber .)
 is the connecting homomorphism obtained by taking a long exact cohomology sequence of the surjection  whose kernel is the tangent bundle .

Remarks 
Because deformation theory has been extended to multiple other contexts, such as deformations in scheme theory, or ringed topoi, there are constructions of the Kodaira–Spencer map for these contexts.

Constructions

Using infinitesimals

Cocycle condition for deformations 
Over characteristic  the construction of the Kodaira–Spencer map can be done using an infinitesimal interpretation of the cocycle condition. If we have a complex manifold  covered by finitely many charts  with coordinates  and transition functions  where Recall that a deformation is given by a commutative diagramwhere  is the ring of dual numbers and the vertical maps are flat, the deformation has the cohomological interpretation as cocycles  on  whereIf the  satisfy the cocycle condition, then they glue to the deformation .

Conversion to cocycles of vector fields 
The cocycle of the deformation can easily be converted to a cocycle of vector fields  as follows: given the cocycle  we can form the vector fieldwhich is a 1-cochain. Then the rule for the transition maps of  gives this 1-cochain as a 1-cocycle, hence a class .

Using vector fields 
One of the original constructions of this map used vector fields in the settings of differential geometry and complex analysis. Given the notation above, the transition from a deformation to the cocycle condition is transparent over a small base of dimension one, so there is only one parameter .

In scheme theory 
Deformations of a smooth varietyhave a Kodaira-Spencer class constructed cohomologically. Associated to this deformation is the short exact sequence(where ) which when tensored by the -module  gives the short exact sequenceUsing derived categories, this defines an element ingeneralizing the Kodaira–Spencer map.

Of ringed topoi 
One of the most abstract constructions of the Kodaira–Spencer maps comes from the cotangent complexes associated to a composition of maps of ringed topoiThen, associated to this composition is a distinguished triangleand this boundary map forms the Kodaira–Spencer map (or cohomology class, denoted ).

Examples

With analytic germs 
The Kodaira–Spencer map when considering analytic germs is easily computable using the tangent cohomology in deformation theory and its versal deformations. Then for a vector , which has the basisthere the map  sending

On affine hypersurfaces with the cotangent complex 
For an affine hypersurface  over a field  defined by a polynomial , there is the associated fundamental triangleThen, applying  gives the long exact sequenceRecall that there is the isomorphismfrom general theory of derived categories, and the ext group classifies the first-order deformations. Then, through a series of reductions, this group can be computed. First, since is a free module, . Also, because , there are isomorphismsThe last isomorphism comes from the isomorphism , and a morphism in  send giving the desired isomorphism. Then, the Kodaira–Spencer map sends a deformationto the element .

See also 
Deformation theory
Cotangent complex
Schlessinger's theorem
characteristic linear system of an algebraic family of curves
Gauss–Manin connection
Derived category
Ext functor

References 

Mathoverflow post relating deformations to the jacobian ring.

Algebraic geometry